The Anderson–Darling test is a statistical test of whether a given sample of data is drawn from a given probability distribution. In its basic form, the test assumes that there are no parameters to be estimated in the distribution being tested, in which case the test and its set of critical values is distribution-free. However, the test is most often used in contexts where a family of distributions is being tested, in which case the parameters of that family need to be estimated and account must be taken of this in adjusting either the test-statistic or its critical values.  When applied to testing whether a normal distribution adequately describes a set of data, it is one of the most powerful statistical tools for detecting most departures from normality.
K-sample Anderson–Darling tests are available for testing whether several collections of observations can be modelled as coming from a single population, where the distribution function does not have to be specified.

In addition to its use as a test of fit for distributions, it can be used in parameter estimation as the basis for a form of minimum distance estimation procedure.

The test is named after Theodore Wilbur Anderson (1918–2016) and Donald A. Darling (1915–2014), who invented it in 1952.

The single-sample test

The Anderson–Darling and Cramér–von Mises statistics belong to the class of
quadratic EDF statistics (tests based on the empirical distribution function).

is the Cramér–von Mises statistic.  The Anderson–Darling (1954) test is based on the distance

Thus, compared with the Cramér–von Mises distance, the Anderson–Darling distance places more weight on observations in the tails of the distribution.

Basic test statistic

The Anderson–Darling test assesses whether a sample comes from a specified distribution.  It makes use of the fact that, when given a hypothesized underlying distribution and assuming the data does arise from this distribution, the cumulative distribution function (CDF) of the data can be assumed to follow a uniform distribution. The data can be then tested for uniformity with a distance test (Shapiro 1980). The formula for the test statistic  to assess if data  (note that the data must be put in order) comes from a CDF  is

 

where

 

The test statistic can then be compared against the critical values of the theoretical distribution. In this case, no parameters are estimated in relation to the cumulative distribution function .

Tests for families of distributions

Essentially the same test statistic can be used in the test of fit of a family of distributions, but then it must be compared against the critical values appropriate to that family of theoretical distributions and dependent also on the method used for parameter estimation.

Test for normality

Empirical testing has found that the Anderson–Darling test is not quite as good as the Shapiro–Wilk test, but is better than other tests.  Stephens found  to be one of the best empirical distribution function statistics for detecting most departures from normality.

The computation differs based on what is known about the distribution:

 Case 0: The mean  and the variance  are both known.
 Case 1: The variance  is known, but the mean  is unknown.
 Case 2: The mean  is known, but the variance  is unknown.
 Case 3: Both the mean  and the variance  are unknown.

Let

The values  are standardized to create new values , given by

With the standard normal CDF ,  is calculated using

An alternative expression in which only a single observation is dealt with at each step of the summation is:

A modified statistic can be calculated using

If  or  exceeds a given critical value, then the hypothesis of normality is rejected with
some significance level.

Note 1: If  = 0 or any (0 or 1) then  cannot be calculated and is undefined.

Note 2: The above adjustment formula is taken from Shorack & Wellner (1986, p239). Care is required in comparisons across different sources as often the specific adjustment formula is not stated.

Note 3: Stephens notes that the test becomes better when the parameters are computed from the data, even if they are known.

Note 4: Marsaglia & Marsaglia provide a more accurate result for Case 0 at 85% and 99%.

Alternatively, for case 3 above (both mean and variance unknown), D'Agostino (1986)  in Table 4.7 on p. 123 and on pages 372–373 gives the adjusted statistic:

and normality is rejected if  exceeds 0.631, 0.754, 0.884, 1.047, or 1.159 at 10%, 5%, 2.5%, 1%, and 0.5% significance levels, respectively; the procedure is valid for sample size at least n=8.

Tests for other distributions

Above, it was assumed that the variable  was being tested for normal distribution. Any other family of distributions can be tested but the test for each family is implemented by using a different modification of the basic test statistic and this is referred to critical values specific to that family of distributions. The modifications of the statistic and tables of critical values are given by Stephens (1986) for the exponential, extreme-value, Weibull, gamma, logistic, Cauchy, and von Mises distributions. Tests for the (two-parameter) log-normal distribution can be implemented by transforming the data using a logarithm and using the above test for normality. Details for the required modifications to the test statistic and for the critical values for  the normal distribution and the exponential distribution have been published by Pearson & Hartley (1972, Table 54). Details for these distributions, with the addition of the Gumbel distribution, are also given by Shorack & Wellner (1986, p239). Details for the logistic distribution are given by Stephens (1979). A test for the (two parameter) Weibull distribution can be obtained by making use of the fact that the logarithm of a Weibull variate has a Gumbel distribution.

Non-parametric k-sample tests
Fritz Scholz and Michael A. Stephens (1987) discuss a test, based on the Anderson–Darling measure of agreement between distributions, for whether a number of random samples with possibly different sample sizes may have arisen from the same distribution, where this distribution is unspecified. The R package kSamples and the Python package Scipy implements this rank test for comparing k samples among several other such rank tests.

For  samples the statistic can be computed as follows under the assumption that the distribution function  of -th sample is continuous

where
  is the number of observations in the -th sample 
  is the total number of observations in all samples
  is the pooled ordered sample

See also
Kolmogorov–Smirnov test
Kuiper's test
Shapiro–Wilk test
Jarque–Bera test
Goodness of fit

References

Further reading
 Corder, G.W., Foreman, D.I. (2009).Nonparametric Statistics for Non-Statisticians: A Step-by-Step Approach Wiley, 
 Mehta, S. (2014) Statistics Topics 
 Pearson E.S., Hartley, H.O. (Editors) (1972) Biometrika Tables for Statisticians, Volume II.  CUP. .
 Shapiro, S.S. (1980) How to test normality and other distributional assumptions. In: The ASQC basic references in quality control: statistical techniques 3, pp. 1–78.
 Shorack, G.R., Wellner, J.A. (1986) Empirical Processes with Applications to Statistics, Wiley. .
 Stephens, M.A. (1979) Test of fit for the logistic distribution based on the empirical distribution function, Biometrika, 66(3), 591–5.

External links
US NIST Handbook of Statistics

Statistical tests
Nonparametric statistics
Normality tests